Zagreb local elections, 2013 were held on 19 May 2013 in Zagreb, the capital of Croatia, to elect the mayor and members of the Zagreb Assembly. A second round of mayoral election was held on 2 June 2013.

Results

Mayor

Assembly election

Councils of districts

See also
2013 Croatian local elections
List of mayors in Croatia
List of mayors of Zagreb

References 

Zagreb 2013
Zagreb local
Zagreb 2013
2010s in Zagreb
Elections in Zagreb